Emperor Charles or Emperor Karl may refer to:

 Charlemagne (742–814), first Holy Roman Emperor
 Charles the Bald (823–877), counted as Emperor Charles II
 Charles the Fat (839–888), counted as Emperor Charles III
 Charles IV, Holy Roman Emperor (1316–1378)
 Charles V, Holy Roman Emperor (1500–1558)
 Charles VI, Holy Roman Emperor (1685–1740)
 Charles VII, Holy Roman Emperor (1697–1745)
 Charles I of Austria (1887–1922), Emperor of Austria, King of Hungary and Bohemia
 Charles of Valois, titular Emperor of Constantinople
 Emperor Charles (film), a 1921 Austrian silent film